The Planning and Energy Act 2008 (c 21) is an Act of the Parliament of the United Kingdom.

Section 1 - Energy policies
Section 1(1) provides:

Section 1(2) defines the expressions "energy efficiency standards" and "energy requirements".

Section 1(3) defines the expression "appropriate national authority".

Section 2 - Interpretation
This section defines the expressions "development plan documents" and "local development plans". It provides that they have the same meaning as in Part 2 of the Planning and Compulsory Purchase Act 2004 and as in the Town and Country Planning Act 1990 respectively.

See also
Planning Acts

References
Halsbury's Statutes,

External links
The Planning and Energy Act 2008, as amended from the National Archives.
The Planning and Energy Act 2008, as originally enacted from the National Archives.

United Kingdom Acts of Parliament 2008